Siah Mansur-e Sofla (also Romanized as Sīāh Manşūr-e Soflá and Seyāh Manşūr-e Soflá; also known as Sīāh Mansūr, Sīāh Manşūr-e Pā’īn, and Sīyāh Mansūr) is a village in Vahdatiyeh Rural District, Sadabad District, Dashtestan County, Bushehr Province, Iran. At the 2006 census, its population was 111, in 22 families.

References 

Populated places in Dashtestan County